The Blessed Martyrs of Drina are the professed Sisters of the Congregation of the Daughters of Divine Charity, who died during World War II. Four were killed when they jumped out of a window in Goražde on 15 December 1941, reportedly to avoid being raped by Chetniks, and the last was killed by the Chetniks in Sjetlina the following week. The five nuns were later declared martyrs and beatified by Pope Benedict XVI (delegated to Cardinal Angelo Amato) on 24 September 2011.

History

Background

On 6 April 1941, Axis forces invaded the Kingdom of Yugoslavia. Poorly equipped and poorly trained, the Royal Yugoslav Army was quickly defeated. The country was then dismembered. The extreme Croatian nationalist and fascist Ante Pavelić, who had been in exile in Benito Mussolini's Italy, was appointed Poglavnik (leader) of an Ustasha-led Croatian state – the Independent State of Croatia (NDH). The NDH combined almost all of modern-day Croatia, all of modern-day Bosnia and Herzegovina and parts of modern-day Serbia into an "Italian-German quasi-protectorate." NDH authorities, led by the Ustasha Militia, subsequently implemented genocidal policies against the Serb, Jewish and Romani populations living within the borders of the new state.

Ethnic Serbs were persecuted the most because Pavelić and the Ustashas considered them "potential turncoats" in what they wanted to be an ethnically pure state composed solely of Croats. Racist, anti-Serbian, and antisemitic laws were passed, and ethnic Serbs, representing about 30 percent of the NDH's population of 6.3 million, became targets of large-scale massacres perpetrated by the Ustashas.

By mid-1941, these killings reached degrees of brutality that shocked even some Germans. The Cyrillic script was subsequently banned by Croatian authorities, Orthodox Christian church schools were closed, and Serbs were ordered to wear identifying armbands. Mile Budak, the Croatian Minister of Education, is reported to have said that one-third of Serbs in the NDH were to be killed, one-third were to be expelled, and one-third were to be converted to Roman Catholicism. The Ustashas also established numerous concentration camps where thousands of Serbs were mistreated, starved, and murdered. Two resistance movements emerged to combat the NDH and the Axis occupiers—the royalist Serb Chetniks, led by Colonel Draža Mihailović, and the multi-ethnic, communist Yugoslav Partisans, led by Josip Broz Tito.

Jezdimir Dangić was a gendarmerie officer prior to the outbreak of World War II. In 1940, he was appointed to lead the gendarmerie detachment in the Yugoslav royal palace. During the invasion of Yugoslavia, he was responsible for escorting King Peter II to Nikšić Airport as he left the country. Dangić then returned to Belgrade and was in the city when it was occupied by the Germans. He obeyed the summons of Milan Aćimović, head of the first Serbian puppet government, to serve in the gendarmerie of the Serbian quisling state and did so until mid-August.

When news reached him of the Ustasha massacres of Serbs in Bosnia, he sought permission to travel there and escort his family and relatives to safety. In the summer his request was approved, and he travelled via Mihailović's headquarters at Ravna Gora. Early on, Mihailović designated Dangić as one of three men who were to succeed him as leaders of the Chetnik movement in the event of his death or capture. Like Mihailović, Dangić sought to avoid conflict with the Germans and began to pursue a policy of "self-defence against the Ustashas and revenge against the Croats and Muslims".

In August 1941, Dangić was sent by Mihailović to eastern Bosnia to take command of the Chetnik detachments in the region and bring them under Mihailović's control. He collected a group of Bosnian Serbs and crossed the Drina River into the NDH, arriving in eastern Bosnia on 16 August. In the beginning, his operations were directed primarily against the Ustashas and the Bosnian Muslim population of the area. By early September, Dangić had established himself as the leader of all Chetnik groups in eastern Bosnia.

Capture of Goražde
In late November 1941, Major Boško Todorović reached an agreement with Lieutenant-Colonel Castagnieri, commander of the Italian garrison in Goražde, regarding the Italian evacuation and hand-over of the town to the Chetniks. On 29 November 1941, the Italians placed Goražde under the control of Dangić's men. The town was under complete Chetnik control by 1 December. Upon arrival, Dangić gave a speech to a group of Serbs, Croats and Bosnian Muslims gathered in the town's main square which contained references to Greater Serbia and ended with Dangić proclaiming that Serbs and Bosnian Muslims could no longer live together. Following the speech, Chetnik bands spread through the town and began killing, raping, pillaging and torching homes. A significant number of victims were killed on a bridge over the Drina, after which their bodies were dropped into the river.

Croatian Home Guard prisoners and NDH officials were immediately executed. Corpses of Muslim civilians were left hanging from trees and lamp-posts. As many as several hundred civilians may have been killed in the massacre. Chetnik forces in Bosnia, including those of Dangić, then set about pursuing an anti-Muslim campaign through eastern Bosnia to recompense for the persecution experienced by ethnic Serbs in the NDH.

Martyrdom
Dangić's Chetniks entered the town of Pale on 11 December. They looted and burnt down the local Roman Catholic convent, Marijin dom, and captured its five nuns (two Slovene, one Croat, one Hungarian, and one Austrian). The five were Jula Ivanišević (b. 1893), Berchmana Leidenix (b. 1865), Krizina Bojanc (b. 1885), Antonija Fabjan (b. 1907) and Bernadeta Banja (Bernadett Bánya) (b. 1912). That evening, the nuns and some other prisoners were forced to march across the Romanija mountain range in freezing temperatures and waist-deep snow. The five were mocked, insulted and threatened by their captors as they marched. While passing through the village of Sjetlina, 76-year-old sister Leidenix became exhausted. She was separated from the group and forced to remain behind.

The four remaining nuns were taken to Goražde on 15 December and detained on the third floor of a former Royal Yugoslav Army barracks upon arrival. That evening, a group of Chetniks entered the room in which they were being held and attempted to rape them. The four then jumped from the second-floor window to avoid being raped, but ended up dying. Some sources  hold that all four survived their attempted jumps and were bayoneted to death by several infuriated Chetnik officers. In any case, the bodies were taken from the barracks and thrown into the Drina River. Sister Leidenix was taken to a forest near Sjetlina by several Chetniks on 23 December, having been told that she would soon be taken to Goražde to be reunited with the other nuns. She was never seen again. One of the Chetniks who emerged from the forest without her was later seen wearing her rosary around his neck.

Aftermath and legacy

News of the deaths quickly spread throughout the NDH. In April 1942, Dangić was arrested by the Germans and taken to a prisoner-of-war camp in German-occupied Poland. He escaped from prison in 1943 and participated in the Warsaw Uprising against the Germans the following year.

Dangić was captured by the Red Army in 1945 and extradited to Yugoslavia's new communist authorities, who charged him with war crimes. He was tried, found guilty by a court in Sarajevo and sentenced to death. He was executed by firing squad on 22 August 1947.

The five nuns were declared martyrs, On 14 January 2011, Pope Benedict XVI announced the promulgation of decrees of the Congregation for the Causes of Saints. The nuns were beatified at a ceremony presided over by Cardinal Angelo Amato in Sarajevo on 24 September 2011.

A non-fiction book about the nuns was written by Croatian author Anto Baković, titled Drinske mučenice (Drina Martyrs; Sarajevo, 1990). Sister Slavica Buljan, a Bosnian-Croatian nun, writer and poet, wrote Zavjet krvlju potpisan (Vow Signed With Blood; Zagreb, 2010).

Notes

References

Further reading
 Franc Ksaver Meško: Izbrano delo I-VI Mohorjeva družba v Celju (1954–1960)
 Anto Baković: Drinske mučenice, Vlastita svjedočanstva, Svjedočanstva očividaca, Dokumenti, Anto Baković, Sarajevo 1990.

External links
 

1941 deaths
20th-century Roman Catholic martyrs
Beatifications by Pope Benedict XVI
Chetnik war crimes in World War II
Austrian Roman Catholic religious sisters and nuns
Croatian Roman Catholic religious sisters and nuns
Hungarian Roman Catholic religious sisters and nuns
Croats of Bosnia and Herzegovina
1941 in Bosnia and Herzegovina
Martyred groups
Roman Catholic Archdiocese of Vrhbosna
World War II crimes in Yugoslavia
Year of birth unknown